Strelitzia caudata, commonly known as the mountain strelitzia or wild banana, is a species of banana-like Strelitzia from Africa from the Chimanimani Mountains of Zimbabwe south to Mozambique, the Northern Provinces of South Africa and Eswatini (Swaziland). It was first described in 1946 by Robert Allen Dyer in Flowering Plants of Africa , Volume 25, Plate 997. The specific epithet caudata means chopped, this refers to an appendage of a sepal, which occurs only in this species. It is one of three large banana-like Strelitzia species, all of which are native to southern Africa, the other two being S. alba and S. nicolai.

Description 
Growing up to 8 metres tall, it has a leafless woody stem and has a fan shaped crown.The leaves are 2 by 0.6m, greyish-green in colour and are arranged in two vertical ranks. The seeds are black with a tuft of bright orange hairs.

Habitat 
It usually grows in dense clumps, in areas of montane forests and is found between rocks on steep grassy slopes.

References

Flora of Mozambique
Flora of Zimbabwe
Flora of Swaziland
Flora of the Northern Provinces
Plants described in 1946
Strelitziaceae